Sodium pareth sulfate is a surfactant found in some detergent products such as hand or body washes, but not as commonly as other chemicals such as sodium laureth sulfate (SLES).  It is the sodium salt of a sulfated polyethylene glycol ether. 

It is produced similarly to SLES starting from fatty alcohols with 10 to 16 carbon atoms.

External links

Ethers
Organic sodium salts
Anionic surfactants
Sulfate esters